Yall So Stupid was an American alternative hip hop group based in Atlanta, Georgia, United States. After performing extensively in Atlanta's underground circuit, the group was signed by Dallas Austin & L.A. Reid to Rowdy Records in 1992. Their debut album, Van Full of Pakistans, was released on May 25, 1993. 

In 1995, H2O formed the group Massinfluence with Audessey, Cognito and Spearhead X.

In popular culture
 Rapper Sage Francis alludes to both the group and their first album on the Non-Prophets song "Disasters" from their album Hope, with the line "Yall so stupid, like a van full of Pakistans at a Klan rally".
 Rap group Das Racist reference Y'all So Stupid and "a van full of pakis" in Kool A.D.'s verse in their song Hugo Chávez on their mixtape Shut Up, Dude.

Discography
Van Full of Pakistans (1993)

References

American hip hop groups
Southern hip hop musicians
Musical groups from Georgia (U.S. state)
Musical groups established in 1991
Musical groups disestablished in 1993
Musical quartets
1991 establishments in Georgia (U.S. state)
Rowdy Records artists